Tepee Creek is a stream in the U.S. state of South Dakota.

Tepee Creek was named for the fact ranchers discovered abandoned tepee parts near the creek.

See also
List of rivers of South Dakota

References

Rivers of Fall River County, South Dakota
Rivers of South Dakota